The 1972 Texas A&M Aggies football team represented Texas A&M University in the 1972 NCAA University Division football season as a member of the Southwest Conference (SWC). The Aggies were led by head coach Emory Bellard in his first season and finished with a record of three wins and eight losses (3–8 overall, 2–5 in the SWC).

Schedule

Roster

References

Texas AandM
Texas A&M Aggies football seasons
Texas AandM Aggies football